Hadena maccabei is a species of cutworm or dart moth in the family Noctuidae. It is found in North America.

The MONA or Hodges number for Hadena maccabei is 10323.1.

References

Further reading

 
 
 

Hadena
Articles created by Qbugbot
Moths described in 2002